Kavithai is a 2004 Indian Tamil-language romantic action film written and directed by Kicha. It stars Vamsi and Chaya Singh. The score and soundtrack for the film was by Deva.

Cast 
Vamsi as Sakthi
Chaya Singh as Subbulakshmi
Sarath Babu as Subbulakshmi's father
Nalini as Subbulakshmi's stepmother
Fathima Babu
Shakeela as 'Madam'
Sukran

Production
The film marked the acting debut of Hemachandran, who was credited in the film as Vamsi.

The film was also known under the alternate title of Kavithai Kathalukku Mattum.

Release and reception
Sify.com's review noted it was a "well-made youth oriented film with an innovative story and a good climax". A reviewer from the entertainment portal ChennaiOnline.com noted "it's a story of star-crossed lovers, and the director has managed to make it fairly appealing till the first half", adding "but then the innumerable twists and turns he introduces into the script keeps the audience wondering if the story would ever have an ending". Balaji Balasubramaniam of BBThots.com wrote "the problem with Kavithai is that makes its key twist rather obvious and then makes us wait until the midway point to unveil it, but to the movie's credit, it recovers quite well and presents a fairly engaging second half that is not as completely predictable".

References

External links

2004 films
2000s Tamil-language films
Indian romantic drama films
2004 romantic drama films